The Balkan Athletics Indoor Championships, also known as the Balkan Indoor Games, is an annual international regional indoor track and field competition between athletes from the Balkans. Following a test event in 1991, it was officially launched in 1994. Organised by the Association of the Balkan Athletics Federations (ABAF), it is typically held in February. The competition complemented the long-running annual outdoor track and field tournament: the Balkan Games.

It received strong support from the Hellenic Amateur Athletic Association – until 2002, the Peace and Friendship Stadium in Piraeus, Greece was the permanent host, as this was the only international standard indoor track and field arena in the region at that point. The Peania Indoors Arena, in the Metropolitan area of the Greek capital, took on hosting duties from 2003 to 2006, then began alternating with the Faliro, Piraeus stadium. The event was cancelled in both 2010 and 2011 due to the insolvency of the Greek athletics body, linked to the Greek government-debt crisis. The event was continued in 2012 with Turkey as the new host nation, which had built the Ataköy Athletics Arena for the 2012 IAAF World Indoor Championships. The Balkan competition served as a major test event for the global championships.

The programme of events has been similar to that of the IAAF World Indoor Championships, except for the omission of the combined track and field events and (usually) the 4 × 400 metres relay. Women's pole vault was introduced in 1998, giving the sexes event parity, and the 200 metres for both sexes was dropped after 2005 in line with international standards. The 1994 championships featured racewalking competitions, but these were dropped for subsequent editions. In addition to individual titles, a men's and a women's team title is awarded to the best performing nation in each section. Both medal tables and points tables are collated, with the points score contributing to the team title. The points table was introduced in 2002.

A total of seventeen nations have entered the competition during its history, with Yugoslavia and Serbia and Montenegro being former competitors; all successor states of Yugoslavia have since competed independently, bar Kosovo. The initial competition was between six nations, which expanded to nine by the end of the 1990s. The number of competing nations was further expanded between 2011 and 2014, with five more countries being admitted by the ABAF. Azerbaijan has also competed as a guest nation; its performances were discounted for medal and points-scoring purposes. Romania and Greece have historically been the most successful nations at the event, although Turkey has been the most dominant since 2012.

Editions

 Team winners decided by medals up to 2001, with the points scoring format introduced in 2002.

Participation

 Note: † = former competing nation
 As Federal Republic of Yugoslavia

Championships records
Key:

Men

Women

References

External links
Association of Balkan Athletic Federations website

 
Athletics competitions in Europe
Indoor
Recurring sporting events established in 1994
February sporting events
Indoor track and field competitions